Damson or damson plum, also archaically called the "damascene" is an edible drupaceous fruit, a subspecies of the plum tree.

Damson may also refer to:

People
Damson Idris (born 1991), English television, movie and stage actor
Willy Damson (1894-1944), German politician

Places
Damson Brook, a small river in Wiltshire, United Kingdom
Damson Park, a stadium in Damson Parkway, Solihull, West Midlands, England

Others
Damson gin, a liqueur made from damson plums macerated in a sugar and gin syrup
Damson (horse) (foaled 21 April 2002), an Irish Thoroughbred racehorse and broodmare